Jessica Thoennes (born September 20, 1995) is an American rower. She competed in the women's eight event at the 2020 Summer Olympics. She is openly bisexual.

References

External links
 

1995 births
Living people
American female rowers
Olympic rowers of the United States
Rowers at the 2020 Summer Olympics
Place of birth missing (living people)
American LGBT sportspeople
21st-century American women